MV Wight Sky is a new design of roll-on/roll-off car and passenger ferry operating on Wightlink's Lymington to Yarmouth, Isle of Wight route.

History
Wight Sky was constructed at the Kraljevica shipyard in Croatia and launched on 12 April 2008. After fitting out, she left Croatia on 15 September 2008 and arrived in Portsmouth on 2 October 2008.

Design
Wight Sky, the second of three new vessels built for Wightlink, is a completely new design of vessel with more comfortable passenger facilities. The design by naval architects Hart Fenton & Company (now Houlder Ltd), utilises fixed and mobile mezzanine decks, complete disabled access and a larger cafe and sundeck area.  There is a passenger lift between the car deck and passenger decks.

The new vessels do not have the additional third deck of the old C-class ferries, with the space incorporated into the passenger lounges. They are intended to last as long as the C-class vessels they replace.

Service
Wight Sky is in service on the Yarmouth-Lymington crossing, with her sister ships Wight Light and Wight Sun. The Wight class vessels should be able to run to the existing timetable, with a scheduled crossing time of 30 minutes and 15 minutes turnaround.

The three previous vessels that ran the Lymington to Yarmouth route were retired and initially stored at Portsmouth. 35-year-old Cenred was brought back into service on 12 March 2009, when Wight Light broke down and was taken out of service for repairs to her hydraulic ramp.

Footnotes

Ships of Wightlink
2008 ships